Psycho House (sometimes referred to as Psycho House: Psycho III) is a 1990 novel by American writer Robert Bloch, a sequel to his 1959 novel Psycho and 1982 novel Psycho II.

The novel is not related to the 1986 film Psycho III or the 1990 film Psycho IV: The Beginning.

Plot summary
Ten years after Norman Bates' death, a local entrepreneur has rebuilt the Bates Motel in Fairvale as a tourist attraction. Amy Haines travels to the infamous "Psycho House" to write a book about Bates when mysterious murders begin to occur. Haines faces resistance from the community when she enlists the help of a group to investigate the murders.

References

External links

Psycho House & Bates Motel Timeline

1990 American novels
American horror novels
American thriller novels
Novels set in hotels
Novels set in California
Tor Books books
Novels by Robert Bloch
Psycho (franchise)